Carlos Marqués-Marcet (Barcelona, 1983) is a Spanish film director, screenwriter and film editor best known for his first fictional film 10,000 km.

Biography 
Carlos Marqués-Marcet studied Audiovisual Communication at Universitat Pompeu Fabra, in Barcelona, where he had his degree in 2006. His fourth short film Udols was awarded as the best short film of the year 2008 by Cahiers du Cinéma.

In 2008 he flew to Los Angeles (California) to attend a master in Film Direction at the University of California, Los Angeles (UCLA).

His first fictional film was 10,000 km, made in Barcelona in 2014. This film won a lot of awards in some film festivals, as Málaga Film Festival, Goya Awards (best new director) or Gaudí Awards (best director), among others.

Filmography

Short films 
 Amunt i avall (2006, "Up and down")
 Fora de joc (2007, "Offsides")
 Udols (2008, "Howls")
 I'll be alone (2010)
 5456 Miles away (2010)
 Say goodnight (2011)
 The yellow ribbon (2012)
 Mateix lloc, mateixa hora (2012, "Same place, same hour")

Non fiction 
 De pizarros y atahualpas (2009, "About Pizarros and Atahualpas")
 El día que la conocimos (2012, "The day we met her")

Films 
 10,000 km (2014)
 13 dies d'octubre (2015, "13 days of October")
 Terra ferma / Tierra firme (2017, "Anchor and Hope")
 Els dies que vindran (2019, "The Days to Come") 
 La mort de Guillem (2020, "The death of Guillem")

Awards and nominations

Notes

External links 
 Carlos Marqués-Marcet at Vimeo

Spanish film directors
1983 births
Living people
21st-century Spanish screenwriters
Film directors from Catalonia